Txomin Peillen Karrikaburu (17 November 1932 – 9 December 2022) was a French writer, linguist, and biologist.

Biography
Born into a familly originally from Soule, Peillen was born in Montmartre in the 18th arrondissement of Paris to Joannes and Maddalen. He earned a doctorate in Basque studies alongside  and was a professor of Basque philology in Bayonne.

In total, he wrote 43 books, 39 of which were in Basque, three in French, and one in Spanish. Throughout his life, he lived in Bayonne and Sainte-Engrâce.

Peillen died in Cambo-les-Bains on 9 December 2022, at the age of 90.

Publications

Books

In Basque
Gauaz ibiltzen dana (1967)
Itzal Gorria, 1966 urteko Domingo Agirre Saria (1972)
Igela: euskaldun heterodoxoen errebista (1979)
Eliza doneskaiñak, pagan ohitura ta sineste baten ondakina: XVII. mendetik XX. raiño (1980)
Petiri "Agurgarria" Cluñy-koa napar-euskaldun sineste baten jakile (1980)
Xaguxarra: literatur aldizkaria (1980)
Bela-ko zaldunaren Zuberotar hiztegia: XVIII : men-dean (1983)
Oreina eta gizoreina literaturgintzan eta edergintzan (1983)
Urdaitx-etik Santa Graziraino berzokoratu herria (1985)
Euskal antzertia: le théâtre basque (1987)
Euskalki literarioak (1992)
Itzal gorria (2000)
Ehiza eta zepoka: (zuberoako basabürüan) (2002)
Euskaldun etorkinak Ameriketan (2003)
Mende joanaz (2003)
Abd El Kader: olerkia (2006)
Joanes Leizarraga: vida y obra (2007)
Jende ederrak lanean: (who's who?) (2008)
Biziaren hiztegiaz (2009)

In French
Parlons euskara : la langue des Basques (1995)
Les emprunts de la langue basque à l'occitan de Gascogne : étude du dialecte souletin de l'euskara (1998)
Conception du monde et culture basque (1998)

In Spanish
Poema filosofico manuscrito del siglo XIX (1982)
El castellano y lo español en la provincia de Sola o Zuberoa (1986)
Teatro popular europeo (1999)

Novels
Gauaz ibiltzen dana (1967)
Itzal gorria (1972)
Gatu beltza (1973)
Atxorra eta altximia (1982)
Aldjezairia askatuta (1982)
Aintza txerriari! (1986)
Kristina Bolsward (1991)
Alarguntsa beltza (2001)
Ale berdea (2001)
Ale gorriak (2001)
Jan Dabrowski (2013)
Nina Waita : arupu baten itzalean (2015)
Zaldi beltzak zeruan (2018)

Essays
Jusef Egiategiren lehen liburia (1983)
Bizidunak haurren eta helduen heziketan (1995)
Euskaldunen ingurugiroan (espazioa eta denbora) (2001)
Bosquejos vasco-uruguayos (2003)
Baloreak Euskal Herrian eta beste gizarteetan (2005)

Poetry
Mende joanaz (2003)

Autobiography
Paristar euskaldun bat (ni... neu) (1987)

Ethnologies
Allande Elixagari ligiarraren ixtorioak (1985)
Animismua Zuberoan (1985)
Herri-sendakuntza eta sendagingoa Zuberoan (1998)
Zuberoako itzal-argiak (euskarazko jakilegoak) (1998)

References

1932 births
2022 deaths
French writers
Basque-language writers
People from Pyrénées-Atlantiques